Jhon Alexander Castañeda (born 19 February 1992) is a Colombian racewalking athlete. He represented Colombia at the 2020 Summer Olympics in the men's 20 kilometres walk.

Career
On 11 May 2011, Castañeda set the South American under-20 record in the 5000 metres race walk.

In February 2014, Castañeda represented Colombia at the 2014 South American Race Walking Championships and did not finish. He represented Colombia at the 2015 Pan American Race Walking Cup in May 2015 and finished in 18th place.

In June 2017, Castañeda represented Colombia at the 2017 South American Championships in the 20,000 meter walk and won a silver medal. In June 2018, he represented Colombia at the 2018 South American Games in the 20 kilometers walk and finished in fourth place.

In May 2019, Castañeda represented Colombia at the 2019 South American Championships in the 20,000 meter walk and won a gold medal. In October 2019, he represented Colombia at the 2019 World Athletics Championships in the men's 20 kilometres walk and was disqualified.

He again represented Colombia at the 2021 South American Championships in May 2021 and won a silver medal. He represented Colombia at the 2020 Summer Olympics in the men's 20 kilometres walk and finished in 27th place.

References

1992 births
Living people
Colombian male racewalkers
Athletes (track and field) at the 2015 Pan American Games
Athletes (track and field) at the 2020 Summer Olympics
Olympic athletes of Colombia
Sportspeople from Bogotá
World Athletics Championships athletes for Colombia
21st-century Colombian people